Cretasalia is an extinct genus of prehistoric frogs from Mongolia.

See also
 Prehistoric amphibian
 List of prehistoric amphibians

References

Late Cretaceous amphibians
Fossil taxa described in 1999
Cretaceous frogs